Plugg (also spelled plug) is a subgenre of trap music, that stems from the production style of Zaytoven, later polished and expanded by beatmakers from Beatpluggz collective, mainly by MexikoDro, StoopidXool, PoloBoyShawty and Ka$h3x in the mid-2010s via online distribution on platform SoundCloud.

Unlike mainline trap, which is defined by bombastic production and rattling hi-hat drum patterns, Pluggnb is said to be dreamy, laidback, atmospheric, spacey, airy, minimal
and catchy, described as having overall lush and jazzy atmosphere, ethereal
multi-instrumental harmonies and melodies, sparse, disjoint, and relaxed drum programming with few hi-hats, and thick basslines. Instead of hi-hats in mainline trap, plugg drumming mainly employs beat skips, crash cymbals and punctuated accent snares on half-beats. As described by a critic, plugg is best intended to be heard alone, "experience[d] .. [in] the way it's intended: as a day-long trance in your isolated abode".

Vocally, plugg ranges from instrumental beats without vocals, to songs with either rapping or mellow singing. Rapping flows, used in plugg, range from aggressive to relaxed and mellow.

Etymology
The genre got its name from the famous "Plug!" producer tag used by the members of BeatPluggz collective since 2013. As MexikoDro claimed, either StoopidXool or someone else from Beatpluggz recorded the vocals for the tag. At first, their tag used the word "Plugs!", but later they shortened it to "Plug!"

Both variants "plugg" and "plug" are used to describe the genre. Other names for the genre include descriptive terms such as "new wave" and "smooth jazz" (not to be confused with new wave and smooth jazz genres).

History

Origins and first mainstream wave

Origins of plugg music are traced to the gospel and soul-influenced production style of Zaytoven and other southern rap influences, such as OutKast, as well as to loosely related subgenre of hip-hop called Chicago bop, which is a euphoric, fast-paced subgenre of drill music. Plugg first emerged around 2013 as a cohesive production style of the collective called Beatpluggz including Atlanta-based producers MexikoDro and StoopidXool. Plugg was inspired by Zaytoven, Project Pat, Juicy J, Gucci Mane, the snap rap group D4L and the Paper Mario Nintendo soundtrack. MexikoDro and his fellow Beatpluggz members gained viewership via the SoundCloud platform, where plugg picked up an underground following. Plugg has been described as "near-ambient and intoxicating", a strong departure from the popular styles of the day.

From around 2014 on, rappers like Playboi Carti, Rich The Kid, Diego Money, Kodak Black, Lil Yachty, Famous Dex, Yung Bans and Reese LaFlare brought mainstream attention to plugg for the first time by working with Beatpluggz and releasing tracks such as "Broke Boi" (by Playboi Carti), "Plug!" (by Rich the Kid and Kodak Black), "Hella O's" (by Lil Yachty), "New Wave" (by Rich the Kid and Famous Dex), "Harrassin Me" (by Kodak Black and Humble Haitian), "Dresser" (by Yung Bans) "No Cap" (by Yung Bans and Reese LaFlare). Around the same time, rapper Nebu Kiniza recorded his viral hit single "Gassed Up" (later certified platinum) over the same plugg beat that was used in "Plug!" by Rich the Kid. Among them, Carti was the first one to appreciate the production style of Beatpluggz, and also recorded other plugg records, such as "Money Counter", "Don't Tell Nobody", "Smash Pt.2" and "Chill Freestyle" around that time. Despite "Broke Boi" being his breakthrough hit, Playboi Carti never actually paid back to MexikoDro for these plugg beats, as MexikoDro later claimed in interviews. Whether Rich the Kid paid for the beat for his "Plug!", which also was one of the biggest plugg hits of the day, song or not also remains dubious.

During the first wave, plugg beats, mainly done by Beatpluggz, also helped to shape careers of UnoTheActivist, Thouxanbanfauni and Yung Gleesh.

The first mainstream wave of plugg was mainly a fad and quickly faded away as the rappers (Famous Dex, Rich the Kid, Lil Yachty) moved on to work with other producers. Playboi Carti had publicized creative break-up with MexikoDro, which was described "ugly" and moved on to work with Pi'erre Bourne, who wasn't making plugg. Despite the aforementioned developments, in the underground during that time, plugg maintained consistent following and evolution, mostly thankfully to the online-centric nature of the subgenre.

Second wave: PluggnB scene, Drake
The new wave of plugg started in 2017–2020 and stemmed mainly from several sources. First, a new style of plugg emerged, called PluggnB, which combined plugg production with melodic, dreamy contemporary R&B synths. 
Among the originators of this new style stood XanGang, producer collective Surreal Gang, producers CashCache, Dylvinchi, Milanezie and various rappers, such as BBY Goyard, I$AIAH, 909Memphis, rapper-producer Neiburr, and the now-defunct artistic collective known as SlayWorld, whose roster included some of the names most associated with the pluggnb scene such as Autumn!, Summrs and Kankan. 
Many of these artists have since moved away from pluggnb in favour of more mainstream sounding trap.

At the same time, a new wave of primarily plugg-oriented rappers emerged, many of whom grew listening to plugg, namely BoofPaxkMooky, whose style is described to be reminiscent of the Playboi Carti-MexikoDro era songs, and whose 2021 mixtape produced by StoopidXool called "Four Seasons" was regarded as one of the plugg's purest, according to a critic. Tony Shhnow, described as the one bringing the influence of the 1990s R&B and earlier Southern hip-hop into plugg, 10k Dunkin and others. A new pleiad of plugg producers also emerged closer to 2020, most notable of them being CashCache and Cash Cobain. CashCache was described as a "primary architect" of the plugg sound used by Mooky, Shhnow and 10k Dunkin. He is also regarded as the person bringing more lounge music and more jazz influences in plugg, making a style of plugg dubbed "sleepy plugg".

Around that time in 2020, StoopidXool and Cash Cobain collaborated on an album with a New York City plugg rapper FLEE, and that release included the viral pluggnb hit "SWISH / USE 2" recorded in collaboration with Brent Faiyaz.

While BoofPaxkMooky, Tony Shhnow, 10k Dunkin and FLEE were described as "bringing the most true-to-the-form plug back" into rotation, Lil Tecca, Autumn!, SSGKobe and SoFaygo helped to popularize the pluggnb sound by releasing TikTok hits "Show Me Up", "Knock Knock" and "Thrax", respectively.

At the same time new names kept sprawling in the scene: Summrs and Autumn! brought in influences from the sound typical for "SadBoys" lead by Yung Lean into plugg, other noted new names in the genre included Ka$hdami, 1600J and RewindRaps, among others.

At the same time, plugg gained attention from Drake. Drake first recorded a song called "Plug" on a plugg beat around 2017, allegedly for his Scorpion album, but the song was later removed from the tracklist and only resurfaced online in 2020. Later, also in 2020, Drake included a plugg track produced by MexikoDro titled "From Florida with Love" into his Dark Lane Demo Tapes mixtape. The purported reason for the inclusion of a plugg song into tracklist, was speculated to be the second wave of underground plugg that Drake was aware of.

In 2021, rapper RXK Nephew released over 400 songs, some of which were described as "pluggnB."

Proliferation of micro-subgenres
By the end of 2021, plugg sound flourished and developed further, with multiple artists starting to add more digicore influences into their sound, examples of this being Daesworld's "2003" and Jaydes' "Highschool". Producer Dani Kiyoko defined a darker style of plugg, dubbed "vamp plugg". Tracks such as "Xanax" by St47ic (producer by Dani Kiyoko) typify the "vamp plugg" sound. This style is sometimes conflated with a demonic-sounding, hex-influenced and intentionally lo-fi style of trap known as "sigilkore" that emerged on SoundCloud, spearheaded by rapper Axxturel (previously known as Luci4, among other names) and his now-defunct collective Jewelxxet.

In 2022, the hyperplugg microgenre began trending on SoundCloud and TikTok, when producer-artist Myspacemark started adding influences of hyperpop into his plugg sound up to the point of claiming to have invented the "hyperplugg" subgenre. It was unclear whether the subgenre was intended as an ironic meme or not, but after videos on the microgenre amassed tens of thousands views on TikTok, many fans of Myspacemark took the idea more seriously.

Characteristics
Plugg music is typified by production style of Beatpluggz, first started by MexikoDro. According to CashCache, "simple chords, hard-hitting 808s and repetitive, thoughtful, addictive melodies" typify plugg music. According to trap producer Popstar Benny, the foundation of plugg is "Zaytoven['s] 'street' Atlanta drums, and melodies, [which are] ... a little more 'internet' and litte more videogamey".

808s and drumming
Multiple sources pinpoint the foundation of plugg drumming to Zaytoven's percussion style and samples. Zaytoven's percussion style was influenced by West Coast hip hop of the late 1990s. Many drum samples used by Zaytoven were provided to him by his beatmaking mentor, JT the Bigga Figga, and continue to be used by him ever since.

Zaytoven's drum technique has been described as sparse,  and swinging. The sparse nature of production served the purpose to free up acoustic space for rapper's presence. Zaytoven's drums are primarily centered around heavy 808 bass notes, and, as Zaytoven put it himself,  Zaytoven credits the swinging feel of his typical rhythms to the MPC2000 hardware sampler, which he uses through the career. However MexikoDro and later plugg producers, while emulating Zaytoven's drums, used software drum machines to emulate them.

808 bass notes used in plugg and by Zaytoven and later plugg beatmakers have been described variously as thick, hard, steady, bumping and deep.

Typical 
Zaytoven's drumming is inherently polyrhythmical. Second to the 808 bass notes is usually a clap drum falling on every 2nd and 4th pulse in a measure. Another rhythmic line is usually added by several sparse lines of hi-hats, which only mark every 8th note and otherwise come and go in dense, occasional chumps. Next percussive line is formed by occasional ornamental accented snares. Zaytoven also usually employs various additional percussive elements in his rhythms, such as occasional vocal "ahh" samples, bongos, shakers (the so-called "Zaytoven shaker") and so on, and according to Zaytoven, many of the later beatmakers mainly tried to emulate his drumming by re-using his percussive drum sounds. The complete rhythm usually employs several minor variation throughout the song; and it might be turned on and off throughout the song, creating "beat cuts", or "beat skips".

Chords and melodies

Among the most recognizable traits of plugg are its catchy Nintendo video-game influenced multi-layered melodies with heavy use of chords and xylophone, prevalence of  synths and other soft synthetizer presets sparse drum programming, with frequent crash cymbals, punctuated TR-808 rimshots and other percussion samples, such as maracas, accent snares, and somewhat less frequent hi-hats, 808s in place of kick drums, where kicks themselves are mostly absent. Muffled, heavily low-pass filtered claps are oftentimes used instead of snares.

Unlike original Zaytoven's production which relied heavily on piano and organ riffs together with minimal drumming, Beatpluggz retained the airy tone, structure and minimal drumming of Zaytoven's style but in place of pianos and organs they shifted the focus from using piano and organ to more synthetic sounds and also expanded the rhythmic vocabulary of Zaytoven's work by using wider variety of types of hi-hat, snare and other percussive samples. 808s used in Beatpluggz style also became comparably harder compared to Zaytoven's style.

Other characteristics
Among other defining traits of plugg music is the use of the "Plug!" vocal sample, which first appeared as a producer tag of Beatpluggz collective, but later came to be used by producers inspired by Beatpluggz who were never part of the collective themselves.

Plugg performers may employ a variety of vocals styles, including aggressive rapping, mellow rapping, whispering flow, DMV flow and singing.

Plugg beats YouTube tutorials
Plugg beats are produced on a fast pace and are claimed to be easy to replicate to a producer, given a sheer amount of "type beat" plugg tutorials posted on YouTube, some claiming to teach making plugg beats in as little as 6 minutes. Before multiple plugg beat tutorials appeared on YouTube, MexikoDro himself claimed on the interview, that it takes him 15 minutes on average to make a final beat from scratch, of which production takes 10 minutes and mixing and mastering takes around 5 minutes. Zaytoven would typically also not spend more than 5 to 10 minutes writing his beats.

Regional scenes
Apart from the United States, by the mid-2010s to the early 2020s plugg took root in Europe, particularly in France and the post-Soviet countries, where local plugg scenes were formed thanks to skate videos, fashion trends and growing popularity of hip-hop music.

France
French Parisian rapper Serane first learnt about plugg after listening to "Broke Boi" by Playboi Carti, which changed the way he looked at music and he started producing plugg himself and formed a crew of designers and artists, who coined the local aesthetic of mixing plugg sounds with their reverence to Japanese designer clothes. The crew of Serane, dubbed "#OneTruePath", was noted as somewhat resemblant to Yung Lean and his SadBoys crew from Sweden, who were also largely influenced by imported American hip-hop subgenres during their time.

To Serane's surprise, Atlanta plugg producers were supportive of his crew's efforts. After he collaborated with various American plugg producers and rappers, including ATL Smook, BreezyB, 10K Dunkin, Tony Shhnow, Dylvinchi and CashCache, MexikoDro and StoopidXool themselves contacted him and offered to collaborate on music.

At the same time, Serane met a great deal of criticism at home in France, where, in an aggressive UK drill dominated hip-hop environment, he was oftentimes dismissed as trash, mainly for his offbeat lesser-comprehendible flow.

Besides Serane, other French plugg artists include rappers Southlove, Kasper!, Prince K., Yuri Online (all belonging to No. OneTruePath), 8Ruki, Lil Sandal, producers TTDafool, Voidd, Chenfol (also from #OneTruePath) and others Of them, Chenfol (also variably spelled Chenpol) is described as the originator of plugg sound in France.

Russia and post-Soviet countries

At first, plugg was dubbed minimalistic trap in Runet. Face is commonly cited to be the first rapper from Russia to start rapping over plugg beats back in 2016, with songs such as "Кот" ("Cat") (produced by MexikoDro), "Vans" (produced by MexikoDro) and the "Revenge EP" (2017).  was another early proponent of plugg in Russia, with songs such as "Проснись и пеки" ("Wake and Bake") and "Rare First Basement" (both produced by FrozenGangBeatz in 2016), "Burnout" and "Snake In The Snacks" (both produced by NastyBoy Boo in 2018).

 was also among the first rappers from Russia to put plugg into spotlight with the release of his debut EP "Hoodrich Tales" in 2018, which he described as having "the essence of plugg music", according to his understanding.

In Ukraine, plugg was pioneered by 044 KLAN music collective, particularly by rappers 044 ROSE and 044 yakata.

Rocket, another Russian rapper, further popularized plugg in Russia with his "Supreme Swings" EP in 2020.

From the start, many of the plugg tracks from Russia and post-Soviet countries were recorded over homemade beats, made by producers such as FrozenGangBeatz, Presco Lucci, Neyba Chap, NastyBoy Boo.

In 2020, Russian plugg producer хабип мацуевич (habip matsuevich) recorded ironic track called "убер" ("uber"), referencing the абу бандит ("abu bandit") Russian youth subculture, centered around gopniks from Dagestan and their slang. Later in 2020 the song was uploaded on TikTok accompanied by video of LADA drifting, a common abu bandit leisure activity. On TikTok, the song unexpectedly became a viral hit and thus the oper plugg (опер плаг) subgenre was created. The name "oper plugg" references the оперстайл ("operstyle"), which is used to describe toned-down and lowered black LADAs abu bandits prefer to drift on. In 2021, "oper plugg" was further popularized by кумар рекордс (kumar records), a music collective consisting of джугмейн178рус (dzugmeyn178rus), ЭрикМеф (ErikMef), лилбойтага (lilboytaga) and also by rappers SberbankShawty, xanaxrehabclub, Валюта Скуратов (Valyuta Skuratov), uglystephan, and others.

See also
Cloud rap – an earlier, similarly atmospheric and relaxed subgenre of trap.

References

External links

Plugg genre page at rateyourmusic.com

Trap music
Hip hop genres